Mabee Arena is a 1,500-seat indoor arena in Salina, Kansas. It is located on the campus of Kansas Wesleyan University and is home to the university's men's and women's basketball teams.  The arena is part of the new student activity center which was constructed in 2007 and 2008.

External links 
Kansas Wesleyan University

Sports venues in Salina, Kansas
Basketball venues in Kansas